The basilar crest gives attachment to the outer edge of the basilar membrane; immediately above the crest is a concavity, the sulcus spiralis externus.

References 

Ear